The 370th Flight Test Squadron is a United States Air Force unit assigned to the 413th Flight Test Group, stationed at Edwards Air Force Base, California.

Mission
The squadron is assigned to the United States Air Force Reserve and performs flight testing.

History

World War II
Formed as a heavy bombardment group in January 1942, trained in the Pacific Northwest under Second Air Force, with B-17 Flying Fortresses.   Reassigned to Seventh Air Force in Hawaii, November 1942, performing search and rescue and antisubmarine patrols until January 1943 while transitioning to long-range B-24 Liberator heavy bombers.

Deployed to Central Pacific from Hawaii throughout 1943 for long-range combat bombardment operations against Japanese forces in the Central Pacific; New Guinea; Northern Solomon Islands and Eastern Mandates campaigns.  Deployed to the New Hebrides in the South Pacific and operated from numerous temporary jungle airfields, engaging in long-range bombardment operations during the Bismarck Archipelago; Western Pacific; Leyte; Luzon and Southern Philippines campaigns until the end of the war in August 1945.   Assigned to Clark Field, Philippines after the war ended, demobilized with personnel returning to the United States, unit inactivated as paper unit in January 1946 in California.

Strategic Air Command
Reactivated as Boeing B-29 Superfortress squadron at MacDill Field, Florida in August 1946 as part of Strategic Air Command.  Was a training unit for antisubmarine warfare.

Korean War
Deployed to Okinawa during the Korean War, carrying out combat operations over Korea throughout the conflict. Remained in Okinawa until November 1954 when moved to the United States on paper.

Return to Strategic Air Command
Reformed at Lincoln Air Force Base, Nebraska, as a Boeing B-47 Stratojet medium jet bomber squadron, performed Operation Reflex deployments to North Africa until phaseout of B-47 in 1965 and inactivated.

Flight Testing
Reactivated as a flight test squadron in 2001.

Lineage
 Constituted as the 370th Bombardment Squadron (Heavy) on 28 January 1942
 Activated on 15 April 1942
 Redesignated 370th Bombardment Squadron, Heavy c. March 1944
 Inactivated on 18 January 1946
 Redesignated 370th Bombardment Squadron, Very Heavy on 15 July 1946
 Activated on 4 August 1946
 Redesignated 370th Bombardment Squadron, Medium on 28 May 1948
 Discontinued and inactivated, on 25 March 1965
 Redesignated 370th Flight Test Squadron on 24 September 2001
 Activated in the reserve on 1 October 2001

Assignments
 307th Bombardment Group, 15 April 1942 – 18 January 1946
 307th Bombardment Group, 4 August 1946
 307th Bombardment Wing, 16 June 1952 – 25 March 1965
 413th Flight Test Group, 1 October 2003 – present

Stations

 Geiger Field, Washington, 15 April 1942
 Ephrata Army Air Base, Washington, 27 May 1942
 Sioux City Army Air Base, Iowa, 29 September-21 October 1942
 Kipapa Airfield, Hawaii, 2 November 1942
 Operated from Henderson Field (Midway Atoll), 22–24 December 1942
 Operated from: Luganville Airfield, Espiritu Santo, New Hebrides, c. 6 February-c. 18 March 1943
 Koli Airfield, Guadalcanal, Solomon Islands, 18 March 1943
 Munda Airfield, New Georgia, Solomon Islands, 22 February 1944
 Momote Airfield, Los Negros, Admiralty Islands, 13 May 1944
 Wakde Airfield, Netherlands East Indies, 22 August 1944
 Operated from Kornasoren (Yebrurro) Airfield, Noemfoor, Schouten Islands, c. 20 September-12 November 1944

 Wama Airfield, Morotai, Netherlands East Indies, 14 November 1944
 Clark Field, Luzon, Philippines, 10 September-27 December 1945
 Camp Stoneman, California, 16–18 January 1946
 MacDill Field (later MacDill Air Force Base), Florida, 4 August 1946
 Operated from: Kadena Air Base, Okinawa, beginning c. 4 August 1950
 Kadena Air Base, Okinawa, 15 August 1953
 Lincoln Air Force Base, Nebraska, 19 November 1954 – 25 March 1965
 Operated from: RAF Lakenheath, England, 11 July-5 October 1956
 Edwards Air Force Base, California, 1 October 2001 – present

Aircraft

 Boeing B-17 Flying Fortress, 1942
 Consolidated B-24 Liberator, 1942–1945
 Boeing B-29 Superfortress, 1946–1954
 Boeing B-47 Stratojet, 1955–1965
 Beechcraft C-12 Huron, 2001–present
 General Dynamics F-16 Fighting Falcon, 2001–present
 McDonnell Douglas KC-10 Extender, 2001–present
 Boeing KC-135 Stratotanker 2001–present

References

 Notes

Bibliography

 
 
 

Flight test squadrons of the United States Air Force
Military units and formations in California